Hamilton Golf and Country Club is located in Ancaster, Ontario.

The club began in 1894. Renowned English golf architect Harry Colt designed 18 of the current 27 holes in 1914, with Canadian golf architect Robbie Robinson adding a third nine in 1974. The course has a short course and a driving range.

The club has hosted six Canadian Opens, the last being in June 2019. The course was lengthened and renovated in the late 1990s, in preparation for the recent Opens. The current Chedoke Golf Club, now a municipal course, was the second location of the Hamilton Golf and Country Club, with the original being on the corner of Barton and Ottawa streets.

Hamilton Golf and Country Club has been long regarded as one of the top golf courses in Canada, currently ranking second on Canada's list of best golf courses by ScoreGolf magazine and recently number 98 in Golf Digest's Top 100 Courses in the World. 
Course record- Brandt Snedeker. 10 under par 60 shot June 7. 2019.

Major tournaments hosted
 Canadian Open 1919, won by J. Douglas Edgar
 Canadian Open 1930, won by Tommy Armour
 Canadian Open 2003, won by Bob Tway
 Canadian Open 2006, won by Jim Furyk
 Canadian Open 2012, won by Scott Piercy
 Canadian Open 2019, won by Rory McIlroy

References

External links
 Hamilton Golf and Country Club

Sport in Hamilton, Ontario
Golf clubs and courses in Ontario
Golf clubs and courses designed by Harry Colt
Canadian Open (golf)